Bei uns und um die Ecke (With Us and Around the Corner) is a German children's television series, broadcast in 6 episodes between 2008 and 2009.

See also
List of German television series

External links
 

German children's television series
2008 German television series debuts
2009 German television series endings
German-language television shows
Das Erste original programming